The Tohoku salamander (Hynobius lichenatus) is a species of salamander in the family Hynobiidae, endemic to Japan. Its natural habitats are temperate forests and rivers.

References

Hynobius
Endemic amphibians of Japan
Taxonomy articles created by Polbot
Amphibians described in 1883
Taxa named by George Albert Boulenger